An outdoor bronze sculpture of former British prime minister David Lloyd George by Glynn Williams stands in Parliament Square in London, United Kingdom.

References

External links

 
 David Lloyd George – Parliament Square, London, UK at Waymarking.com

2007 establishments in the United Kingdom
2007 sculptures
Cultural depictions of David Lloyd George
Monuments and memorials in London
Outdoor sculptures in London
Parliament Square
Lloyd George, David
Lloyd George, David
Lloyd George